George Watson (16 March 1922 – 20 September 1978) was  a former Australian rules footballer who played with Fitzroy in the Victorian Football League (VFL).

Notes

External links 
		

1922 births
1978 deaths
Australian rules footballers from Victoria (Australia)
Fitzroy Football Club players
Oakleigh Football Club players